St. Philip the Apostle Russian Orthodox Church is a Russian Orthodox Church located in Sharjah, United Arab Emirates. The church is the biggest church in the country, with an area of  capacity of 20,000 worshippers. The church opened on Saturday August 13, 2011.

Background
Discussions about building the church began in 2005. The church was given approval to start construction in May 2007. The church is the largest in the United Arab Emirates. It was designed by St. Petersburg based architect, Yury Kirs. The church had received its blessings from the head of the parish, Hegumen Alexander Zarkesher of Moscow. It is one of the rarest Russian orthodox churches in design as it has a gold cross on each of the five domes, all made in Russia.

References

External links

Church Homepage (in Russian)

Churches completed in 2011
21st-century Eastern Orthodox church buildings
Churches in the United Arab Emirates
Russian Orthodox church buildings
Buildings and structures in Sharjah (city)
Russian diaspora in Asia
Ukrainian diaspora in Asia